Héroes de Zaci F.C. is a Mexican football club that is currently playing in the Liga TDP for 2021–22 season. In the 2018–19 season, the club is based in Iztapalapa, Mexico City. During the 2020–21 season, the team was on hiatus to improve their ground and take a place in the Liga Premier de México – Serie A for the 2021–22 season but they are now participating in the Liga TDP until they find a ground that meets the requirements to participate.

History
The team was founded in 2015, until 2017 the club was located in Valladolid, Yucatán, the name of the team is based on the old name of its original city and its heroic character. In 2017-18, the team asked not to play during that season due to problems with the local stadium.

As of the 2018–19 season, the team was relocated to Mexico City and returned to participate in the third division. In the promotion phase, the team won one of the two places to play the final series, which allowed Héroes de Zaci to be promoted to Liga Premier de México. On June 15, 2019, Héroes de Zaci won its first championship after defeat Atletico San Francisco by 3–2 on aggregate.

Héroes de Zaci is associated with Yalmakán F.C., team that participates in the Liga Premier de México – Serie A.

On July 29, 2020 Héroes de Zací joins in Serie A after being approved after a one year hold due to stadium requirements were not met. However, to meet the requirements, the team was relocated to Acámbaro, Guanajuato, in addition, the franchise was rented to another administration other than the owners. However, the team was subsequently not approved to participate in the season and again he was put on hiatus to try to participate again from the 2021–22 season.

In 2021–22 season the team returned, but it was enrolled at Liga TDP.

Honors
 Tercera División de México (1):2018–2019

See also
Futbol in Mexico
Mexico City
Tercera División de México

References

External links
Facebook Page

Football clubs in Mexico City
2015 establishments in Mexico